Auto Research Center, also known as ARC Indy, is a research and development company with headquarters in Indianapolis, Indiana USA. It was founded as Reynard Motorsports North American headquarters, and became its own company in 2002.

History

ARC was opened in 1998, as the North American headquarters for Reynard Motorsports. Reynard Motorsports was based at Reynard Park, Brackley, England and at that time was the largest race car designer and manufacture in the world, producing cars for both open wheel and sportscar racing. In the USA, the primary effort was on open wheel in Indycar/CART.

ARC was initially housed a scale model wind tunnel and 7-post test rig, the engineering design suite, scale modeling making/building and tech office were all in the same building. While ARC was a public test facility, in reality Reynard had enough customers that the facility was completely booked by Indycar/CART and the British American Racing F1 race team. Reynard Motorsports went into receivership in 2002, owing to many reasons, but primarily an aborted IPO and costly purchase of Riley & Scott race car manufacture. As ARC was an arm of Reynard Motorsports, it found itself on its own without a parent company.

With staff and a small budget on hand, but no customers, ARC set about to build a NASCAR scale model to entice new customers. The first major customers were NASCAR OEM manufactures, who were impressed with the scale model that had been built. From there, Sportscar racing also became a large focus from other customers. Thus, ARC found itself with a new direction.

In the middle 2000s, ARC expanded its services with the addition of its driveline dyno test rig rapid prototyping and 3d laser scanning. Then, around the start of 2010s, ARC started to further expand its customer base with production OEM scale model testing and commercial semi-trailer truck industry.  In 2008, ARC expanded upon its Indianapolis Headquarter, breaking ground for a large expansion. The engineering suite and scale model making services were all moved to the new addition to help handle the growing increase in customers and expansion from ongoing customers.

ARC timed the commercial trucking market perfectly, as a time when the industry was starting to realize the full importance of aerodynamics, by reducing drag, to save money on fuel costs. ARC took the industry by storm, creating an impact from the start and, over time, working with almost every major commercial OEM and aftermarket producer. ARC has also become an EPA certified testing facility. After that, ARC expanded into CFD, computational fluid dynamics. ARC formed a joint venture with Streamline Solutions to development their own CFD software, ELEMENTS, and purchased its own processing cores. This made Streamline Solutions the first and only CFD supplier in the world that owns/operates test facilities to actually validate its own code. ARC also created a skunkworks research and development engineering division to help push ARC’s innovation in the industry further forward. One such product of skunkworks was the creation of pneumatic tires for scale wind tunnel testing; something only F1 teams had IP technology for. Prior to this, carbon fiber tires had been primarily in the scale model wind tunnels.

In 2015, ARC opened its Aerodynamic Bicycle Testing Facility (ABT). This new facility, housed in the ARC wind tunnel, further shows the growth the company has taken upon, while ensuring that the customer interest is there in all of ARC’s many solutions and services.

ARC continues to keep its commitment to further technology in the transportation industries, with new innovates, such as wind tunnel wall simulation that can automatically move, yaw and curve to increase accuracy of aerodynamic results for race and driver simulations. ARC is a global company with offices located on four continents.

The Wind Tunnel at ARC 
The wind tunnel at ARC was designed with the automotive industry in mind.  The tunnel is a 3/4 open plenum configuration with an optional rolling road and primary and secondary boundary layer control treatments.  The tunnel nozzle has a cross-section that is 2.3 m wide by 2.1 m high.  Force measurements are gathered utilizing a 6 degree of freedom balance mounted internally between the tested model, a vertical sting.  The balance includes an integrated model motion system capable of automated pitch, roll, yaw, and vertical translation with laser measurement feedback.  Additional capabilities can be included in the model for incorporation of automatically or dependently controlled motors (i.e. wheel steer).  In addition to force measurements, the tunnel has capabilities for pressure tap measurements, anemometer measurements, and flow visualization including tufts and oil droplets.   Beyond the standard test measurements, new capabilities have been added for measuring torque and rotation rate, as well as braking controls for wind turbine experiments.

References

External links
Auto Research Center

Automotive companies of the United States
Research and development in the United States
Wind tunnels
Aerodynamics